Marion (minor planet designation: 506 Marion) is a minor planet orbiting the Sun. It was discovered by Raymond Smith Dugan in February 1903, and was later named after a cousin of his.

References

External links 
 Lightcurve plot of 506 Marion, Palmer Divide Observatory, B. D. Warner (2009)
 Lightcurves 506 Marion, tripod.com
 Asteroid Lightcurve Database (LCDB), query form (info )
 Dictionary of Minor Planet Names, Google books
 Asteroids and comets rotation curves, CdR – Observatoire de Genève, Raoul Behrend
 Discovery Circumstances: Numbered Minor Planets (1)-(5000) – Minor Planet Center
 
 

Background asteroids
Marion
Marion
XC-type asteroids (Tholen)
19030217